Stomachaches  (stylized as ) is the debut studio album by Frank Iero, rhythm guitarist and backing vocalist of the American rock band My Chemical Romance, released under the moniker of . It was officially announced in June 2014, and released on August 25, 2014 on Staple Records and B.CALM Press.

Background 
In late 2012, while dealing with painful digestive issues, Iero turned his basement office into a makeshift studio and began writing and recording music. After My Chemical Romance announced their disbandment on March 22, 2013, Iero continued to work on his solo material and eventually released a demo for the song "Joyriding", which he performed live at small venues along with "Stage 4 Fear of Trying". On June 16, 2014, Iero announced via his official website that he signed to Staple Records and would be releasing a full-length solo album entitled Stomachaches under the moniker of frnkiero andthe cellabration. On the record, Iero plays every instrument except for drums which were handled by former My Chemical Romance drummer Jarrod Alexander.

Release 
Stomachaches was released on August 26 in the U.S. The release was celebrated with a live performance at one of Iero's favorite music stores: Vintage Vinyl in Ford, New Jersey. Iero also assembled a touring band composed of Evan Nestor, Rob Hughes and Matt Olsson.  On August 4, 2014 a music video for the album's first single, "Weighted" was released. "Weighted" was released to radio on August 11, 2014. In September and October, Iero supported Taking Back Sunday and the Used on their co-headlining US fall tour. In November, Iero supported Mallory Knox on their tour of the UK.

Reception 

Rob Sayce from Rock Sound magazine describe the album as "Scrappy, idiosyncratic and infectious as hell, far removed from the well-oiled machine of latter-day My Chemical Romance, and all the more bracing for it." Timothy Monger from AllMusic said, "Passionate, and slightly unruly, the 12-song album deals with themes of yearning for acceptance and love, sung over a backdrop of compelling, often ramshackle punk and post-hardcore guitar rock." The album was included at number 40 on Rock Sounds "Top 50 Albums of the Year" list. The album was included at number 21 on Kerrang!s "The Top 50 Rock Albums Of 2014" list.

Track listing
All lyrics written by Frank Iero, all music composed by Frank Iero

Personnel 

 Frank Iero – vocals, guitars, bass guitar, drums (track 6), producer
 Jarrod Alexander – drums, percussion (all tracks except track 6)
 Evan Nestor – backing vocals (tracks 1 and 6 only), lead vocals (track 11 only)
 Ed Auletta – engineer

Charts

Release history

References

External links 
 

2014 debut albums
Frank Iero albums